Jason B. Gailes (born March 28, 1970) is an American rower. He was born in Dighton, Massachusetts.

References 
 
 

1970 births
Living people
Rowers at the 1996 Summer Olympics
Olympic silver medalists for the United States in rowing
American male rowers
Medalists at the 1996 Summer Olympics
People from Dighton, Massachusetts
Pan American Games medalists in rowing
Pan American Games silver medalists for the United States
Rowers at the 1995 Pan American Games